Chang Chi-lan (born 18 September 1996) is a Taiwanese footballer who plays as a midfielder for Taiwan Mulan Football League club Taichung Blue Whale and the Chinese Taipei women's national team.

References

1996 births
Living people
Women's association football midfielders
Taiwanese women's footballers
Footballers from Kaohsiung
Chinese Taipei women's international footballers